Elizabeth Gwillim may refer to:

 Elizabeth Simcoe née Elizabeth Posthuma Gwillim (1762–1850), artist and diarist in colonial Canada
 Lady Elizabeth Gwillim (bird artist) (1763–1807), bird artist in India